Ho Chin-ping (born 23 October 1983) is a male Taiwanese long-distance runner. He competed in the marathon event at the 2015 World Championships in Athletics in Beijing, China.

Ho is from Kinmen. He attended the National Taiwan Sport University, where he was coached by Hsu Gi-sheng.

See also
 Chinese Taipei at the 2015 World Championships in Athletics

References

1983 births
Living people
People from Kinmen County
Taiwanese male long-distance runners
World Athletics Championships athletes for Chinese Taipei
Athletes (track and field) at the 2010 Asian Games
Asian Games competitors for Chinese Taipei